Ma Keqin (born 24 February 1962) is a former professional tennis player from China.

Biography
Ma played for the China Davis Cup team in a total of 10 ties in the 1980s.

His two appearances on the Grand Prix circuit both came in doubles, at the 1984 Japan Open and 1987 Livingston Open, making the round of 16 in the former.

He often partnered with countryman Liu Shuhua in international competition. As a pairing they won two Asian Games medals and competed together at the 1988 Summer Olympics.

References

External links
 
 
 

1962 births
Living people
Chinese male tennis players
Tennis players at the 1988 Summer Olympics
Olympic tennis players of China
Asian Games silver medalists for China
Asian Games bronze medalists for China
Tennis players at the 1982 Asian Games
Tennis players at the 1986 Asian Games
Medalists at the 1982 Asian Games
Medalists at the 1986 Asian Games
Tennis players from Hubei
Asian Games medalists in tennis
20th-century Chinese people